The Hôtel Otlet is an Art Nouveau building designed by Octave van Rysselberghe on the corner of the / and the / in Brussels, Belgium. This work marks the still cautious insertion of Van Rysselberghe into the current of Art Nouveau.

History
The Hôtel Otlet was built from 1894 to 1898 for the jurist, bibliographer and entrepreneur Paul Otlet. Van Rysselberghe completed this project more than ten years after the completion of his Hôtel Goblet d'Alviella in 1882.

The building was classified as a monument in 1984 and restored from 2001 until 2003. It currently houses a law office.

Location 
The hôtel particulier is located in Brussels, at the corner of the / (no. 48) and the / (no. 13) in the same street where Van Rysselberghe built his personal house (Maison Van Rysselberghe, rue de Livourne no. 83), in the heart of a district that is home to many masterpieces of Brussels Art Nouveau such as the Hôtel Solvay, the Hôtel Tassel and the Hankar House.

Exterior architecture

Style and material
Like Octave Van Rysselberghe's other creations, the Hôtel Otlet was built in a very sober Art Nouveau style, at odds with the rococo excesses of certain Art Nouveau architects such as Gustave Strauven.

The hotel is built in very carefully paired pierre de Savonnières, a golden-colored cut stone from Lorraine, with the exception of the basement, which is made of blue stone.

Asymmetries and sets of volumes
The facade has a turbulent appearance which results from the abandonment of symmetry and the interplay of incoming and outgoing volumes, and which is tempered by an impression of unity conferred by the horizontal lines of the basement and the cornice.

The two completely asymmetrical facades are linked together by a corner oriel window with the most beautiful effect. These facades offer a subtle interplay of volumes (bow window, oriel, cubicles, balcony, loggia and porch), asymmetrical in their shape, their layout and the number of their bays. All these elements are subtly linked together by the cordon which delimits the ground floor and the first floor.

Facade of the Rue de Florence

Ground floor

The ground floor of the rue de Florence facade is pierced by an "in-work" porch, whose vault is made of glazed white bricks. This porch houses a door adorned with a handle with whiplash lines typical of floral Art Nouveau. The door is surmounted by a stained glass window in orange, green and black tones, also featuring floral motifs characteristic of Art Nouveau.

First Floor
The porch is surmounted by a loggia embedded in the facade of the first floor: vaulted with glazed bricks like the porch, it houses two rows of windows, one of which consists of windows of increasing size. This loggia is framed by a cubicle and a bow window.

Facade of the Rue de Livourne 
The facade of the rue de Livourne, of a “stunning variety”, is just as asymmetrical as the facade of the rue de Florence. It begins with a triangular oriel which extends from the ground floor to the first floor to continue with a set made up of three windows surmounted by a rectangular box framed by two small balconies "in-work" and finally to end with a double balcony supported by elegant consoles.

Exterior decoration 
Apart from the games of volumes mentioned above, the only ornament on the facades consists of a frieze of arabesques and scallop shells on a blue background placed under the cornice.

Interior decoration
The centerpiece of its interior design, a stained glass window with a floral motif separates the living room from the grand staircase while providing the latter with additional light. Architect Henry van de Velde helped with the interior decoration.

References

External links
 

Houses in Belgium
City of Brussels
Octave van Rysselberghe buildings
Houses completed in 1898